Eressa analis is a moth of the family Erebidae. It was described by Per Olof Christopher Aurivillius in 1925 and is found in the Democratic Republic of the Congo.

References

 Arctiidae genus list at Butterflies and Moths of the World of the Natural History Museum

Eressa
Moths described in 1925
Erebid moths of Africa